Nikolai Denkov Denkov (Cyrillic script: Никола́й Де́нков Де́нков, born September 3, 1962) is a Bulgarian politician and since May 12, 2021 to August 2, 2022 Minister of Education of the Republic of Bulgaria. Denkov is a physicist, physical chemist and chemist. He is a member of the Bulgarian Academy of Sciences and a lecturer at the University of Sofia.

Life
Nikolai Denkov was born on September 3, 1962, in the Thracian city ​​of Stara Zagora. After elementary school, he moved to the Bulgarian capital Sofia, where he graduated from the National Gymnasium for Science and Mathematics in 1980. This was followed by a master's degree in chemistry and pharmacy at the St. Kliment-Ohridski University in Sofia, which he completed in 1987. In 1993 he defended his dissertation and obtained his doctorate. Denkov has been an adjunct lecturer since 1997 and professor of physical chemistry at the University of Sofia since 2008. Between 2008 and 2015 he was head of the faculty for technical chemistry and director of the master's courseDisperse Systems in Chemical Technologies at the Faculty of Chemistry and Pharmacy, Sofia University. He has been a doctor of chemistry since 2007. He specialized in Japan and at Uppsala University in Sweden and worked as a senior scientist in the research institutes of private companies such as Unilever (USA) and Rhône-Poulenc (France).

Between 2012 and 2013, Denkov was a member of various working groups in the Ministry of Education and Science and in the Council of Ministers. He actively participated in the development of the concept of the Operational Program Science and Education for Smart Growth and in the discussions for the Partnership Agreement for 2013-2020 between the Republic of Bulgaria and the European Commission.

From August 2014 to April 2016, Denkov was Deputy Minister of Education and Science in the Borisov II government, responsible for higher education and the European Structural Funds, including the implementation of the Operational Program Science and Education for Smart Growth. From January 27, 2017, to May 4, 2017, he was Interim Minister for Education and Science in Gerdzhikov's interim government.

In 2019, Denkov was awarded the Solvay Prize of the European Colloid and Interface Society (ECIS) for his research achievements and he was elected a full member of the Academia Europaea. In 2010 he was awarded the highest national award "Pythagoras" for scientific achievements by the Bulgarian Ministry of Education and Science. In 2013 he received the Medal of Honor with Blue Ribbon from the University of Sofia.

Between May 12, 2021, and December 13, 2021, he was again interim minister for education and science in the acting governments of Yanev I and Yanev II during the COVID-19 pandemic. When after the general election in November 2021 that We Continue the Change (PP) had the largest congressional faction was and could form a coalition capable of governing, Denkov became the education minister in the Cabinet of Kiril Petkov selected.

References

Living people
1962 births
Members of Academia Europaea
Members of the Bulgarian Academy of Sciences
Academic staff of Sofia University
20th-century chemists
21st-century chemists
20th-century physicists
21st-century physicists
21st-century Bulgarian politicians
Government ministers of Bulgaria
Education ministers